Athina Oikonomakou (born 6 March 1986) is a Greek actress and businesswoman.

Early years
Oikonomakou was born in 1986 in Skala, Laconia, where she spent her childhood. At the age of 18, she moved in Athens to study at the Agricultural University of Athens. During the second year of her studies, in 2005, she decided to study acting and become an actress. She then moved on to Mimí Deníssi "Stage", from where she graduated in 2007.

Career

Television
Oikonomakou's television debut was in 2007, through the ANT1 series "Deligianneion Parthenagogeion" (directed by Christos Paligiannopoulos), with the role of student Domna Nika. In 2008, she participated in an episode of the romantic series "True Loves" on Alpha (directed by Vassilis Tselemegou), while she also starred in the commercial for Wash & Go. At the same time she took on her first starring role in television in the youth series "The Fearless" where she played with Giannis Vouros. The series was not a great success and was discontinued after just three months of airing.

In 2009, Oikonomakou starred in a commercial for the mobile phone company "Germanos" and made a brief appearance on the Mega Channel series, Latremenoi Mou Geitones as Danae. In the same year, she took the leading role of Xenia Pappas in the Mega Channel series, "The Life of the Other" (directed by Dimitris Arvanitis), a role that made her known to the general public, but also made it quite difficult for her to join the leading cast of the series. Oikonomakou had stated in an interview: "For the Life of the Other I did 30 castings with the director. I think he called me for two months every day and every day he gave me another text. I did not expect to take the role. I had suffered so much. I did so many castings because they did not want me from the channel. I was an inexperienced girl, very young, not at all known and the role was leading, very difficult and strong. So she had to convince them (the director) with many ways that I can." Finally, the series premiered on 27 September 2009 and due to its great success, it ended after three TV seasons, on 6 January 2012. At the same time, in December 2011, she started starring as Chryssa Maltezou in the Mega daily series, "Stolen Dreams", continuing her collaboration with the director Dimitris Arvanitis. In parallel with the daily series, in 2014 she participated in an episode of "Do not start the murmur" and starred in the Cypriot drama series "The Ring of Fire". In the 2015-2016 season, she starred in the comedy "The Worst Week of My Life" (directed by Stefanos Blatsou), along with Makis Papadimitriou, Arietta Moutousi and Gerasimos Skiadaresis.

From 2016 to January 2018, Oikonomakou starred in the Alpha TV series, "Ela sti thesi mou" playing the role of Faia Stathatou, but left due to pregnancy in the middle of the second season. she returned to the series in October 2018 at the beginning of the third season. Her presence in the series continued for the fourth consecutive season.

In November 2020, she appeared as a guest art director at Greece's Next Top Model with Maria Synatsaki for the advertising of their company, Project S.O.M.A.

Stage and film

Theatrically, Oikonomakou made her debut in 2008, with the play "The Flower of Levante" at the Anesis Theater, while in 2010, she participated in the play "The Cactus Flower", which was played in Thessaloniki. In the summer of 2011, she starred in the play "The Desperate" (directed by George Valaris) at the Athena Theater, the 2011-2012 season in "Method of Infidelity" (directed by Ch. Karchadaki) at the Veaki Theater and in the summer of 2012, she toured throughout Greece, with the play "The Baptisms" (directed by Nikos Moutsinas), which was also played at the Ark Theater in the winter season 2012-2013. In the summer of 2013, they toured again. In the 2013-2014 season, she played in the play "The KTEL" (directed by Nikos Moutsina), with which they performed in Thessaloniki in Summer 2014. She has stated that she wants to dedicate herself to her family and that is why she will be late to do theater again.

In the cinema, she has starred in four films. The first was "Bet of Angels" (2008) followed by "A Night in Athens" (2013) by Dimitris Arvanitis, "Amore mio" (2015) and "Magic Mirror" (2016) by Christos Dimas.

Entrepreneurship

Allover by Athina Oikonomakou
In March 2016, Oikonomakou launched her first collection of handmade jewelry, under the name Allover by Athina Oikonomakou. In February 2019, the first Allover store opened in Athens.

Project S.O.M.A.
In June 2019, she jointly launched with Maria Synatsaki, their first line of clothing, under the name Project S.O.M.A., which is available online.

Filmography

Television

Film

Stage

Personal life
In the Summer of 2013, Oikonomakou began her relationship with the businessman Filippos Michopoulos and on 18 November 2017 they got married in a civil ceremony in Gytheio. On 14 March 2018, their son, Maximos, was born and a few months later, on 6 October, the couple got married in a religious wedding in Mykonos. On 8 June 2021, their daughter Sienna-Ilektra was born.

References

External links 

1986 births
Living people
People from Laconia
Greek film actresses
Greek stage actresses
Greek television actresses
Greek women in business
Agricultural University of Athens alumni